Diamond Hill Baptist Church is a historic African-American Baptist church located at Lynchburg, Virginia. It was built in 1886, and is a three-story, "L"-shaped, brick church building in the Late Gothic Revival style.  It has brick buttresses capped with limestone, Gothic pointed arched windows, a three-story entrance tower with steeple, and a jerkinhead roof.  From 1958 to 1963 the pastor was Virgil Wood, the pastor most associated with the Civil Rights Movement in Lynchburg.

Individually listed on the National Register of Historic Places in 2011, it is located in the Diamond Hill Historic District.

References

African-American history of Virginia
19th-century Baptist churches in the United States
Churches on the National Register of Historic Places in Virginia
Baptist churches in Virginia
Churches completed in 1886
Gothic Revival church buildings in Virginia
Churches in Lynchburg, Virginia
National Register of Historic Places in Lynchburg, Virginia
Individually listed contributing properties to historic districts on the National Register in Virginia